Team Brask is a racing team founded by Danish businessman and racing driver Lars-Christian Brask in 1998. The team was formed to compete at every level, but quickly began promoting talented young single-seater drivers. Team Brask's managing director was Alf Boarer, a successful UK based racing driver. Their most successful driver was the Italian Giorgio Pantano whom the team propelled from Karting up to a Formula One test with Benetton in less than two years.

1998 
The team was launched at Stamford Bridge, Chelsea. The driver line up for the first season comprised Alf Boarer and Paul Sheard (Eurocar V6), Lars-Christian Brask and Steve Thompson (Legends Cars) and Mark McLoughlin (Formula First). Thompson finished third whilst McLaughlan was runner-up. Later in the season a new recruit, Westley Barber, won the Elf La Filiere Scholarship in France.

1999 
Rapid expansion of the team saw several wins. Outside of the Eurocar package Andy Priaulx was the overall winner in the Renault Sport Spider championship. Danish drivers Jesper Carslen and Allan Simonsen were added to the line-up and formed part of the winning team at the 1999 Formula Ford World Cup. The team won or placed high in many other events:

 Pickup Truck Championship, Kevin Clarke (Winner)
 Formula Renault Winter Star Cup, Mark McLoughlin (Winner)
 British Touring Car Championship, Michelin Racer of the Year, Mark Blair (Winner)
 British Touring Car Independents Cup Runner-up, Mark Blair
 BRSCC Trophy 	Winner 	Lars-Christian Brask
 Autosport British Club driver of the year 	Winner 	Andy Priaulx
 BRSCC Entertainer of the year, Winner 	Kevin Clarke
 Danish Automobile Sports Young Danish Talent of the Year 	Winner 	Jesper Carlsen
 Eurocar V6 Championship, Runner-up, John Mickel
 Legends Cars Championship, 3rd place, John Mickel
 Formula Palmer Audi Winter Championship, 3rd place, Giorgio Pantano
 Caterham Superlight Challenge, 3rd place, Richard Hay
 Cable 17 Television Motor Sports Personality, Winner, Team Brask

2000 
Giorgio Pantano took part in the German Formula Three Championship and won the title at the first attempt. In the Eurocar package Mark Willis finished second in the V8 competition formula. In total the team had 26 race wins.

2001 
Alex Müller joined the team and took third place in the European Formula 3000 Championship. Pantano moved up from Formula Three to the FIA Formula 3000 Championship and won the Monza race. He was awarded "Autosprint Italian International driver of the year".

Danish auto racing teams
Auto racing teams established in 1998